Reverse migration also called reverse misorientation is a phenomenon in bird migration where a bird flies in the opposite direction of what is typical of its species during the spring or autumn migration.

If a bird sets off in the opposite direction, shown by the orange arrow, it will end up in Western Europe instead of South East Asia. This is a mechanism that might lead to birds such as Pallas's leaf warblers turning up thousands of kilometres from where they should be. Keith Vinicombe suggested that birds from east of Lake Baikal in Siberia (circled) could not occur in western Europe because the migration routes were too north–south. Most of these lost young birds perish in unsuitable wintering grounds, but there is some evidence that a few survive, and either re-orient in successive winters, or even return to the same area.

Reverse migration is genetic or learned behaviour 
Some large birds such as swans learn migration routes from their parents. However, in most small species, such as passerines, the route is genetically programmed, and young birds can innately navigate to their wintering area. Sometimes this programming goes wrong, and the young bird, in its first autumn, migrates on a route 180° from the correct route. This is shown in the diagram, where the typical migration route is shown in red but a reverse migration has occurred as seen in orange in the image.

So with some species such as swans that the migration route is learned and reverse migration could occur from learning an improper route from parents or other birds.

As migration is most often genetically programmed before birth into most birds there can be rare variations and defects that change the migration programming. These variations will account for some but not all of the reverse migration cases. After these birds have changed their migration path, if they survive they may breed with others who also follow this different migration route and reproduce. The offspring from these birds and subsequent generations may now follow the new, genetically programmed migration route.

Methods of examining reverse migration

Tracking radar 
A single individual bird is tracked using a manually operated tracking radar to understand the targets exact position and trajectory to predict where it will be. As the bird flaps their wings the echo can be recorded and compared to patterns to understand flight patterns and changes in flight patterns. These were primarily used to monitor specific individuals during nocturnal migration through the night.

Radio telemetry 
This is a technique used to track animals with a transmitter and receivers. A miniature transmitter is attached to the subject animal and this transmitter emits a very high frequency (30–300 MHz) which can be picked up with one or more receivers. For studying the moment behaviour of birds in a migration hotspot south-west of Sweden called Falsterbo near Falsterbo bird observatory three receivers were used to triangulate and track the birds.

Ringing 
Ringing birds means attaching a lightweight metal band with an identification number to the foot such that it does not impair movement but stays on the bird. This identification number can provide people who catch these birds with movement and history information such as how old they are and where they have been. At the Falsterbo bird observatory these birds are caught with a mist net measured and banded.

Patterns in reverse migration

Reverse migration is the opposite direction or random directions? 
Reverse migration is widespread around the world and occurs for many species migrating during the night and also during the day. This irregular migration direction is most often approximately opposite to what is species typical not a random direction. This phenomenon occurs not only with species migrating to a tropical area during the winter months but also with temperate zone migrants, short irruptive food migrants, short-distance migrant, and long-distance migrants.

An article in British Birds by James Gilroy and Alexander Lees suggests that misorientation primarily occurs approximately opposite direction but can occur in random directions.  These random directions could be partly due to genetic variations or abnormalities. These birds that adopt and continue to migrate in this atypical directions have been called Pseudo-vagrancy migrators. Pseudo-vagrancy is the possibility that a bird will migrate in a different area or direction from the normal migration route. Some species have been found to be more likely than others for having the pseudo-vagrancy migration changes. Yellow-breasted Bunting is considered a lower chance of pseudo-vagrancy behaviours as compared to the Yellow-browed Warbler for having a higher chance of pseudo-vagrancy behaviours.

Solitary reverse migration during the night 
It was found that solitary birds migrating during the night are more likely to reverse migrate West, when East is the regular migratory path. This West to East reverse migration was observed more often than a reverse migration to the North rather than the normal South migration. To only examine single species this study examined birds solitarily migrating during the night so that they do not group-migrate and influence other species to follow or follow other species.

Reverse migration due to inadequate fat stores 

Reverse migration is more likely to occur with bird species that have low fat storage compared to higher fat storage.

 Using radio tracking, thrush songbirds migrating southwards were tracked to examine when and why some during a stopover along the northern coast of Mexico some would not continue south but fly inland northerly. These songbirds that changed their normal seasonal southerly migration were almost all found to be lean and low on fat stores. This inland northerly path may show that the normal stopover location did not have adequate resources to increase fat stores of these birds. So, because they were unable to gain enough fat stores these reverse migrating songbirds moved inland northerly in search of more food.

The reverse migration behaviour has also been seen in the shorebirds red knots who fly in the reverse to typical migration direction. These red knot shorebirds who travel 200 km reverse migration behaviour have been documented over the last 10 years and is a common occurrence. In this study there was not significant difference in body mass fat stores or sex for these reverse migrating birds. It was seen that the birds that made the reverse migration had significantly lower hematocrit which is the percentage of red blood cells. It has been examined before that birds increase their hematocrit before consuming large amounts of food for fat stores in order to have energy for their long migration flight. This would explain why these birds chose to travel in reverse 200 km for high-quality softshell prey to supply fat and increase their hematocrit blood levels before attempting the long migration flight.

Reverse migration due to avoid flying over large expanses of water 
Reverse migration is occasionally observed in Door County, Wisconsin. When birds traveling north reach the tip of the Door Peninsula and the islands beyond, the long stretches of water sometimes unnerves them. Instead of crossing over to the Garden Peninsula, they turn around and fly back down the peninsula.

See also 
Drift migration

References 

Bird migration